Roman Taymurazovich Dzhigkayev (born 29 November 1993) is a Russian football player. He plays for FC West Armenia.

Club career
He made his debut in the Russian Professional Football League for FC Torpedo Armavir on 28 March 2015 in a game against FC Krasnodar-2.

He made his Russian Football National League debut for FC Luch-Energiya Vladivostok on 11 July 2016 in a game against FC Mordovia Saransk.

Personal life
He is the younger brother of footballer Georgi Dzhigkayev.

References

External links
 Profile by Russian Professional Football League
 

1993 births
Sportspeople from Vladikavkaz
Living people
Russian footballers
Association football midfielders
FC Zimbru Chișinău players
FC Luch Vladivostok players
FC Armavir players
FC Spartak Vladikavkaz players
FC Volga Nizhny Novgorod players
FC Zenit-Izhevsk players
FC Chikhura Sachkhere players
Moldovan Super Liga players
Russian First League players
Russian Second League players
Armenian First League players
Erovnuli Liga players
Russian expatriate footballers
Expatriate footballers in the Czech Republic
Expatriate footballers in Moldova
Expatriate footballers in Armenia
Expatriate footballers in Georgia (country)